Christian Jacob "C. J." Conrad (born May 9, 1996) is a former American football tight end. He played college football at Kentucky.

College career 
In his career at Kentucky, Conrad compiled eighty receptions, one thousand fifteen receiving yards, and twelve receiving touchdowns. His twelve touchdowns are second all-time for tight ends at Kentucky behind James Whalen.

Professional career

Playing career 
After going undrafted in the 2019 NFL Draft, Conrad was signed by the New York Giants. He was waived on August 31, 2019 and was signed to the practice squad the next day. He was released on September 17. He signed a reserve/future contract with the Giants on January 2, 2020. On April 28, 2020 Conrad was released by the Giants.

Coaching career 
In July 2020, Conrad joined the University of Kentucky football staff as a graduate assistant while pursuing his master's degree.

Personal life 
His parents, Mike and Lois Conrad, both played basketball at Tiffin University. His brother, Austin, plays defensive end at Ohio. His sister, Mackenzie, played collegiate softball at Akron and Coastal Carolina.

References 

Living people
1996 births
American football tight ends
Kentucky Wildcats football players
New York Giants players
People from LaGrange, Ohio
Players of American football from Ohio
Sportspeople from Greater Cleveland